The Dream is a one-act ballet adapted from Shakespeare's A Midsummer Night's Dream, with choreography by Frederick Ashton to music by Mendelssohn arranged by John Lanchbery. It was premiered by The Royal Ballet at the Royal Opera House, Covent Garden on 2 April 1964 in a triple bill with Kenneth MacMillan's Images of Love and Robert Helpmann's Hamlet.

Background
The ballet was presented to mark the 400th anniversary of Shakespeare's birth. Ashton drastically trimmed Shakespeare's plot, discarding Theseus and Hippolyta and the play-within-a-play, Pyramus and Thisbe. The focus of the ballet is on the fairies and the four lovers from Athens lost in the wood. Lanchbery adapted the overture and incidental music Mendelssohn had written for the play in 1826 and 1842. Ashton and his designers, Henry Bardon and David Walker, set the action in or about the 1840s.

Plot
In the forest outside Athens, Oberon, king of the fairies, fights furiously with his wife Titania, as they both want the same young Indian in their entourage. Oberon decides to punish Titania for her insolence and sends her servant, the evil fairy Puck, to look for a pansy: the dew of the flower, poured into the eyes of sleeping Titania, will make her fall in love with the first person she will see when she awakens.

Meanwhile, Oberon and Puck meddle in the lives of four mortal lovers who wander their path.

Much confusion ensues, between the four mortals as their loves intertwine, and within a troupe of actors, one of whose numbers is turned into a donkey to become Titania's lover.

Finally, Oberon makes peace with Titania and Puck brings things back to their natural order.

Cast
Titania – Antoinette Sibley
Oberon – Anthony Dowell
Changeling Indian Boy – Alan Bauch
Puck – Keith Martin
Bottom – Alexander Grant
Rustic – Lambert Cox
Rustic – David Jones
Rustic – Keith Milland
Rustic – Ronald Plaisted
Rustic – Douglas Steuart
Helena – Carole Needham
Hermia – Vergie Derman
Demetrius – David Drew
Lysander – Derek Rencher
Peaseblossom – Ann Howard
Cobweb – Mavis Osborn
Moth – Ann Jenner
Mustardseed – Jacqueline Haslam
Source: Royal Opera House performance database.

Critical reception
From the outset the piece received good reviews. Both The Times and The Observer noted that the men's roles were particularly strong. In the latter, Alexander Bland called the piece "the first Ashton ballet to be slanted heavily in favour of the men". When the ballet was staged in New York in 2002, the critic Mary Cargill wrote of the Victorian setting:

Revivals
Ashton's ballet was given by the Royal Ballet's touring company in the 1960s and 70s, with scenery and costumes designed by Peter Farmer. A new production, with Ashton's choreography reproduced under the direction of Anthony Dowell, was given at Covent Garden on 6 June 1986.

Among other productions, Ashton's ballet has been given by the Australian Ballet (1969); the production taught from the Benesh notation score written by Faith Worth. In 1973 The Dream entered the rep of The Joffrey Ballet and set by John Hart and Faith Worth. The following three productions—-the Royal Swedish Ballet (1975), the Dutch National Ballet (1977), the National Ballet of Canada (1977)—-were staged by Faith Worth from her Benesh notation score. American Ballet Theatre (2002). A performance by American Ballet Theatre at the Orange County Performing Arts Center in Costa Mesa, California, was videotaped in July 2003 and is available on a Kultur DVD. It stars Ethan Stiefel as Oberon, Alessandra Ferri as Titania, and Herman Cornejo in a defining performance as Puck.

Notes

1964 ballet premieres
Ballets by Frederick Ashton
Ballets to the music of Felix Mendelssohn
Ballets created for The Royal Ballet
Ballets based on A Midsummer Night's Dream